Arklon Huertas del Pino Cordova (born 16 July 1994) is a Peruvian tennis player.

Huertas del Pino has a career high ATP singles ranking of 453 achieved on 18 July 2022. He also has a career high ATP doubles ranking of 233 achieved on 12 December 2022.

Huertas del Pino represents Peru at the Davis Cup, where he has a W/L record of 0–2.

Huertas del Pino is the older brother of fellow tennis player Conner Huertas del Pino.

Huertas del Pino has previously been banned from competition for as long as two years due to cannabis use.

References

External links

1994 births
Living people
Peruvian male tennis players
Sportspeople from Lima
Doping cases in tennis
21st-century Peruvian people